Todmorden bus station serves the town of Todmorden, West Yorkshire, England. The bus station is owned and managed by West Yorkshire Metro and is situated in the town centre, which is accessed from Burnley Road below the rail viaduct.

The station consists of five stands, and is used by First West Yorkshire, TLC Travel and Rosso who operate services to areas around Todmorden and to the towns of Bacup, Burnley, Halifax, Hebden Bridge, Littleborough, Rawtenstall, Rochdale and Walsden. TLC Travel operate the local minibuses as of 26 January 2014.

The former Borough of Todmorden was only the second municipality in the British Isles to run motor buses, the service having commenced on 1 January 1907.

References

External links
 Metro's Todmorden Bus Station page

Bus stations in West Yorkshire
Todmorden
Transport in Calderdale